明 (Akira) is the fifth album by Melbourne electronica band Black Cab. It was released in 2017.

Track listing

 "Prelude" — 01:49
 "Opening Titles" — 01:51
 "White Lines" — 02:33
 "Scanning" — 00:52
 "Fugitives" — 00:54
 "Night Flight" — 03:12
 "First Contact" — 01:32
 "Singularity" — 01:28
 "Ghosts" — 00:41
 "Tokyo Dusk" — 00:43
 "Second Contact" — 01:23
 "Skyline" — 00:53
 "Ward 2A" — 01:08
 "Underground" — 02:00
 "In The Nursery" — 01:46
 "Rescue Mission" — 01:38
 "Breakout" — 01:59
 "Kagome" — 00:58
 "Military Intervention" — 00:47
 "Conflicting Results" — 01:37
 "Override" — 00:54
 "Battles" — 01:42
 "Rise Of The Lord" — 02:17
 "Raining Light" — 01:26
 "Closing Titles" — 03:36

Personnel

 James Lee — guitar, keyboards
 Andrew Coates — vocals, programming, keyboards
 Simon Polinski — mixing, mastering

References

2017 albums
Black Cab (band) albums